Bourdotia is a genus of bivalves belonging to the family Lucinidae.

The species of this genus are found in Europe.

Species:

Bourdotia boschorum 
Bourdotia subdivaricata 
Lucina ermenonvillensis

References

Lucinidae
Bivalve genera